Andaman Kadhali is a 1978 Indian Tamil-language film, directed by Muktha Srinivasan, produced by Muktha Ramaswamy and written by A. S. Prakasam. The film stars Sivaji Ganesan, Sujatha, Chandra Mohan and Thengai Srinivasan. It was released on 26 January 1978. The film was remade in Telugu as Andaman Ammayi.

Plot 

Shivaji Ganesan is a millionaire who believes money alone is God and is capable of solving all problems. He is the guardian of his boss' daughter who wants him to buy a statue by a sculptor she is crazy about. She wants him to come to Andaman for the same.

However, in the past, Shivaji was an inhabitant of Andaman and was the lover of Sujatha. While she was pregnant on account of them having married in secrecy due to fear of their tribe, he went to get the doctor who insults them. In rage, he kills the doctor and in fear, runs away from Andaman. A millionaire hires him as a servant, sees his good heart and after a good many years, leaves all the money to him with the clause that he has to keep his daughter happy.

To keep his promise, Shivaji goes to Andaman. To his shock, he finds out that the uncle of Sujatha has vowed to tattoo "womanizer" on Shivaji's forehead for ruining Sujatha's life and the sculptor, the one his ward wants to marry, is his own son who wants to make a statue of him in an insulting manner to stand as a symbol of evil. The sculptor, seeing Shivaji's arrogance while being unaware, asks him to get his father in return for the statue and for him to marry his ward. The only way though is that Sujatha has to accept the person as her husband. The doctor too isn't dead and had merely fainted to add to the mix.

It becomes a cat and mouse game as Sujatha will not accept Shivaji as her husband under any circumstance to save him from the humiliation while Shivaji will stop at nothing to keep his word.

Cast 
Sivaji Ganesan as Prabhu
Sujatha as Maragatham
Chandra Mohan as Madhan
Kavitha as Kavitha
Thengai Srinivasan as Dr. Banerji
Manorama as Nandini / Nattiya Abinayasundari
Sukumari as Maragatham's friend
Y. G. Mahendran as Madhan's friend
Kathadi Ramamurthy as Prabhu's secretary
C. I. D Sakunthala as secretary's wife
Senthamarai as Maragatham's uncle
Seema as Madhan's girlfriend

Production 
Andaman Kadhali was the first Tamil film to be shot in Andaman Islands.

Soundtrack 
The music was composed by M. S. Viswanathan, with lyrics by Kannadasan.

Release 
Andaman Kadhali was initially scheduled to release on 10 November 1977 (Diwali day), but delayed to 26 January 1978 (Republic Day) to avoid competition with another Ganesan film, Annan Oru Koyil. The film was a success.

References

External links 
 

1970s Tamil-language films
1978 films
Films directed by Muktha Srinivasan
Films scored by M. S. Viswanathan
Tamil films remade in other languages